Janne Asseri Virtanen (born 1967 in Raisio) is a Finnish actor best known for his supporting role as Robert Degerman in the Finnish nordic noir series Bordertown, having won a Jussi Award for Best Actor in 2007 for the film Frozen City.

References 

1967 births
Living people
Finnish actors
People from Raisio